The Temple of Zeus Hypsistos is an ancient Roman temple dedicated to the Roman deity Zeus, located in the present day town of Al-Dumayr, Syria, located 45 km north-east of Damascus, and known historically as Thelsea.

History
While its construction date is unknown, it was probably a Nabatean building, likely converted to a temple around the 2nd century.

In one of its inscriptions, it mentions a case heard by Emperor Caracalla in Antioch around 216, about the corruption in the temple's priesthood.

Gallery

References

Sources
Millar, Fergus (1993). The Roman Near East, 31 B.C.-A.D. 337. p. 317. .

Ancient Roman buildings and structures in Syria
Ancient Roman temples
Archaeological sites in Rif Dimashq Governorate
Temples of Zeus
2nd-century religious buildings and structures
Temples in Syria